Paul G. Campbell Jr. (born July 10, 1946) is a Republican member of the South Carolina Senate, representing the 44th District since 2007. He is an alumnus of Clemson University.

In November 2017 he was arrested for a driving under the influence of alcohol and giving false evidence to police (in saying he wasn't in charge of the vehicle in question). Magistrate Elbert Duffie dismissed his case agreeing that he was not driver of the vehicle.

References

External links
South Carolina Legislature – Paul G. Campbell Jr. official SC Senate website
Project Vote Smart – Senator Paul G. Campbell Jr. (SC) profile
Follow the Money – Paul G. Campbell Jr.

Republican Party South Carolina state senators
1946 births
Living people
People from Ashe County, North Carolina
21st-century American politicians